Anisya Vladimirovna Olkhova (Russian: Анисия Владимировна Ольхова: born 28 November 1991, in Moscow) is a Russian competitor in synchronized swimming.

She won a gold medal at the 2013 World Aquatics Championships, a gold medal at the 2014 European Aquatics Championships, and a gold medal at the 2013 Summer Universiade.

References
FINA profile

Living people
Russian synchronized swimmers
1991 births
World Aquatics Championships medalists in synchronised swimming
Swimmers from Moscow
Synchronized swimmers at the 2013 World Aquatics Championships
Universiade medalists in synchronized swimming
Universiade gold medalists for Russia
European Aquatics Championships medalists in synchronised swimming
Medalists at the 2013 Summer Universiade